was a politician and cabinet minister in the pre-war Empire of Japan.

Biography

Arai was a native of Niigata Prefecture. After graduating from Niigata University, he worked for a period as an elementary school teacher. Subsequently, relocating to Tokyo, he graduated from the law school of Tokyo Imperial University, specializing in French law. His classmates included the future Prime Minister of Japan, Wakatsuki Reijirō and President of the Permanent Court of International Justice Mineichirō Adachi. In 1892, he accepted a post in the Ministry of Finance, rising to head the Budget Bureau. During this period, he also served as a lecturer at the predecessor to Hosei University.
In 1907, Arai was sent to Korea, which had recently become a protectorate of Japan, as a bureaucrat under the Japanese Resident-General of Korea. Following the annexation of Korea in 1910, Arai was assigned to head the Treasury Bureau under the Governor-General of Korea, a post he held to 1917.
In May 1917, Arai was recalled to Japan, and was appointed to a seat in the Upper House of the Diet of Japan. In 1922, he was asked to become Minister of Agriculture & Commerce under the Katō Tomosaburō administration. 

Arai resigned his seat in the House of Peers in October 1926 and was appointed to the Privy Council. He became Vice-President of the Privy Council in 1936, and died in office in 1938.

References
Duus, Peter. The Abacus and the Sword: The Japanese Penetration of Korea, 1895–1910 (Twentieth-Century Japan - the Emergence of a World Power. University of California Press (1998). .

 

1863 births
1938 deaths
University of Tokyo alumni
Politicians from Niigata Prefecture
Government ministers of Japan
Members of the House of Peers (Japan)